Edik Sajaia (born 16 February 1981) is a Georgian former professional footballer who also holds Russian citizenship.

Club career
He made his debut in the Russian Premier League in 2001 for FC Torpedo Moscow. He played 2 games in the UEFA Cup 2001–02 for FC Torpedo Moscow.

External links

1981 births
Living people
Footballers from Georgia (country)
Expatriate footballers from Georgia (country)
Georgia (country) international footballers
Expatriate footballers in Russia
Erovnuli Liga players
FC Torpedo Moscow players
FC Dinamo Tbilisi players
FC WIT Georgia players
FC Lokomotivi Tbilisi players
FC Borjomi players
FC Anzhi Makhachkala players
Russian Premier League players
FC Volga Nizhny Novgorod players
FC Khimki players
FC Arsenal Tula players
FC Zestafoni players
FC Chikhura Sachkhere players
FC Sasco players
Association football defenders